The Tallinn Trophy is an international figure skating competition, typically held in November or December in Tallinn, Estonia. In some years, its senior categories are included in the ISU Challenger Series. Medals may be awarded in men's singles, ladies' singles, pair skating, and ice dancing.

Senior medalists
CS: ISU Challenger Series

Men

Ladies

Pairs

Ice dancing

Junior medalists

Men

Women

Pairs

Ice dancing

Advanced novice medalists

Men

Ladies

Ice dancing

References

External links
 Official site
 Official YouTube channel

 
ISU Challenger Series
International figure skating competitions hosted by Estonia
Sports competitions in Tallinn
Winter events in Estonia